WorkSafe is a term used for workplace health and safety organisations.

 Worksafe Inc, workers' health and safety non-profit organization in Oakland, California
 WorkSafeBC, the Workers' Compensation Board of British Columbia
 WorkSafe New Zealand, the workplace health and safety regulator in New Zealand
 WorkSafe Victoria, the trading name of the Victorian Workcover Authority
 Worksafe (Western Australia), an agency in the Western Australian Department of Commerce

See also
 Not safe for work, a term describing web content not suitable for workplace or public viewing